Thukpa (Tibetan: ཐུག་པ ; ; IPA: /tʰu(k̚)ˀ˥˥.pə˥˥/ ) is a Tibetan noodle soup, which originated in the eastern part of Tibet. Amdo thukpa (especially thenthuk) is a famous variant among the Indians (especially Ladakhis and Sikkimis), Tibetans and Nepalese. Thukpa can be prepared in both vegetarian and non-vegetarian variations; the most popular non-vegetarian variation includes chicken. There are numerous varieties of thukpa which includes:

 Thenthuk: Hand-pulled noodle
 Gyathuk: Chinese noodle
 Thuppa
 Thugpa: Hand-rolled pinched noodle (like gnocchi)
 Drethug

Etymology
Thukpa has been described as a "generic Tibetan word for any soup or stew combined with noodles."

Regional traditions

Indian thukpa
In India, the dish is consumed by people of Nepalese and Tibetan origin in the state of Sikkim, the district of Darjeeling and in the union territory of Ladakh.

Nepalese thukpa
The Nepalese version of Thukpa in general has a predominant vegetarian feature and a bit of spicier flavor. The protein ingredients of the dish are given vegetarian alternative according to availability, including beans, chickpeas, gram, kidney beans, etc. However, non-vegetarian Thukpa are also enjoyed by some people. Egg Thukpa is probably the second most popular variety after vegetarian Thukpa among Nepalese. Coriander leaves, spring onion, or garlic leaves are the popular Nepalese choices of garnish.

Gallery

See also
 Thukpa bhatuk
 List of soups
 List of Tibetan dishes
 List of Nepalese dishes

External links
 What Lends Flavour to this Comforting Noodle Soup?

References

 

Tibetan cuisine
Nepalese cuisine
Indian cuisine
Indo-Caribbean cuisine
Noodle soups